Emmanuel Tony Harihiru (died June 1986) was a Solomon Islands politician. He served as a member of the National Parliament from 1980 until his death, and was Minister of Works and Public Utilities and Minister of National Economic Planning.

Biography
Harihiru was born in Tarapaina in Malaita Province and studied business studies at the University of the South Pacific.

A member of the Solomon Islands United Party, he contested the Small Malaita seat in the 1980 general elections and was elected to Parliament. He was subsequently appointed Minister of Works and Public Utilities by Prime Minister Peter Kenilorea. After being re-elected in 1984, he was appointed Minister of National Economic Planning. However, he died in June 1986 after a brief illness at the age of 39. He was survived by his wife and four children.

References

People from Malaita Province
University of the South Pacific alumni
Members of the National Parliament of the Solomon Islands
Government ministers of the Solomon Islands
1986 deaths